The 1996 Oceania Junior Athletics Championships were held in Townsville, Australia, between November 28–30, 1996.  They were held together with the 1996 Oceania Open Championships. A total of 35 events were contested, 18 by men and 17 by women.

Medal summary
Complete results can be found as compiled by Bob Snow on the Athletics Papua New Guinea, on the Athletics Weekly, and on the World Junior Athletics History webpages.

Boys under 20 (Junior)

Girls under 20 (Junior)

Medal table (unofficial)

Participation (unofficial)
An unofficial count yields the number of about 112 athletes from 16 countries:

 (5)
 (34)
 (5)
 (5)
 (1)
 (2)
 (6)
 (14)
 (4)
 (3)
 (11)
 (7)
 (7)
/ (5)
 (1)
 (2)

References

Oceania Junior Athletics Championships
International athletics competitions hosted by Australia
Oceanian U20 Championships
1996 in Australian sport
Youth sport in Australia
1996 in youth sport